Fluorometholone (INN, BAN, JAN) (brand names Efflumidex, Flucon, FML Forte, FML, others), also known as 6α-methyl-9α-fluoro-11β,17α-dihydroxypregna-1,4-diene-3,20-dione, is a synthetic glucocorticoid which is used in the treatment of inflammatory eye diseases. The C17α acetate ester, fluorometholone acetate (brand name Flarex), is also a glucocorticoid and is used for similar indications. 

Most common indication for this drug is seasonal allergic conjunctivitis and other allergies of the eye.

See also
 9α-Bromo-11-ketoprogesterone
 Flugestone
 Medrysone

References

External links
 Drugs.com
  flarex 
 Alcon official page
 Fluorometholone all you should know.

Glucocorticoids
Halohydrins
Organofluorides
Novartis brands
Pregnanes
Progestogens